Sonniniidae is a diverse family of Middle Jurassic ammonites ranging from those with stout evolute shells to those whose shells are sharply rimmed, oxyconic. The keel, which runs along the middle of the venter, is typically hollow. Sutures vary from simple to complex. The aptychus is shiny with coarse folds (Cornaptychus).

Sonniniidae are included in the superfamily Hildoceratoidea. Most lived during the middle Bajocian stage. Distribution is worldwide except for boreal.

Taxonomy
Sonniniidae  is divided into subfamilies with 10 genera.

Sonniniidae Buckman, 1892
Sonniniinae Buckman, 1892
Dorsetensia
Pseudoshirbuirnia Dietz, 2005
Shirbuirnia
Sonninia
Sonninites Buckman, 1923
 Witchelliinae Callomon and Chandler, 2006
Asthenoceras
Fontannesia
Guhsania
Newmarracarroceras Hall, 1989
Witchellia

Distribution
Argentina, Canada, China, Germany, Hungary, Morocco, Saudi Arabia, Spain, the United Kingdom.

References
W. J. Arkell et al., 1957. Mesozoic Ammonoidea; Treatise on Invertebrate Paleontology, Part L. Geological Society of America and University of Kansas Press.

 
Ammonitida families
Hildoceratoidea
Jurassic ammonites
Middle Jurassic first appearances
Middle Jurassic extinctions